The Antares 17 is an American trailerable sailboat that was designed as a daysailer and pocket cruiser and first built in 1987.

The Antares 17 is a development of the Sovereign 17, with a new deck design.

Production
The design was built by Sovereign Yachts in the United States, starting in 1987, but it is now out of production.

Design
The Antares 17 is a recreational keelboat, built predominantly of fiberglass. It has a fractional sloop rig; a cuddy cabin; a spooned, raked stem, an angled transom, a transom-hung rudder controlled by a tiller and a fixed fin keel or stub keel and centerboard. It displaces  and carries  of ballast.

The boat is normally fitted with a small outboard motor in a stern well, for docking and maneuvering.

The design has sleeping accommodation for two people, with two berths in the open cockpit. The galley is located in the cuddy cabin, with a stove to port and a sink to starboard, with the portable-type  head in between. An ice chest may be stowed in the forepeak.

See also
List of sailing boat types

References

Keelboats
1980s sailboat type designs
Sailing yachts
Trailer sailers
Sailboat types built by Sovereign Yachts